Osceola National Forest is a National Forest located in northeast Florida.

Osceola National Forest was created by President Herbert Hoover's proclamation on July 10, 1931.  It is named in honor of the noted Seminole warrior, Osceola.

It is located in parts of Columbia, Baker, Bradford, and Hamilton counties. The forest administration headquarters are in Tallahassee, as are all three National Forests in Florida. Local ranger district offices are located in Olustee. There is one officially designated wilderness area in the forest, the   Big Gum Swamp Wilderness.

Geography and ecology
Within the forest is the Osceola Research Natural Area, designated a National Natural Landmark in December 1974.

Osceola National Forest is home to many birds as well as mammalian and reptilian species, including the alligator, eastern indigo snake, two species of skunk, muskrat, black bear, coyote, raccoon, gopher tortoise, bobcat, two species of fox, opossum, cougar, fox squirrel, and red-cockaded woodpecker an endangered species.

Activities
A  section of the Florida National Scenic Trail is included in the park grounds.  Other hiking trails in the park include: Olustee Battlefield Trail (an American Civil War battlefield), Trampled Track Trail, and Mt. Carrie Trail.  Two horseback riding trails pass through open pine flatwoods and near scenic bays.  The park is also open to hunters and fishermen with permits.

Campsites
 Ocean Pond Campground - Ocean Pond Campground is located on the north side of Ocean Pond, a  natural lake. Sixty-seven campsites are available for tents, trailers, or motor homes. Ocean Pond provides a variety of recreational experiences such as fishing, boating, water skiing and camping. A beach area, boat ramp, drinking water, hot showers, and flush toilets are located in the campground.
 The Landing Group Area - Available by reservation only, this is a 50-person private group area. Recreational activities include swimming, boating, camping, and picnicking. Facilities include a sand beach, boat launch for small boats, picnic shelter, large group grill, and restrooms with showers.
 Hunt Camps - Hunt camps include Hog Pen Landing, Cobb, Wiggins, West Tower, and East Tower. These are primitive camp sites.

See also
 Apalachicola National Forest
 Ocala National Forest
 Olustee Battlefield Historic State Park is within Osceola National Forest

References

External links

 Osceola National Forest official site at United States Forest Service
 Florida National Scenic Trail
 Great Florida Birding Trail
 Ocean Pond Campground - official site at Osceola National Forest
 The Group Landing - official site at Osceola National Forest
 Hog Pen Landing - official site at Osceola National Forest
 Cobb Hunt Camp - official site at Osceola National Forest
 Wiggins Hunt Camp - official site at Osceola National Forest
 West Tower Hunt Camp - official site at Osceola National Forest
 East Tower Hunt Camp - official site at Osceola National Forest

 
National Forests of Florida
National Natural Landmarks in Florida
Protected areas of Columbia County, Florida
Protected areas established in 1931
Protected areas of Baker County, Florida
Protected areas of Bradford County, Florida
Protected areas of Hamilton County, Florida
1931 establishments in Florida